Società (Italian: Society) was an Italian communist cultural magazine published in Italy between 1945 and 1961.

History and profile
Società was founded as a quarterly magazine in Florence in 1945. The founders were Ranuccio Bianchi Bandinelli, Cesare Luporini and Romano Bilenchi. Bandinelli also directed the magazine. In 1948 the magazine became closer to the Italian Communist Party (PCI), but was not published by the party. The headquarters was later moved to Rome, and in 1954 its frequency was switched to bimonthly.

Società featured Italian fiction and poetry and occasionally included some essays on the theater and the cinema. It was one of the publications read by the Italian intellectuals, who had Gramscian views. Giorgio Napolitano was one of the regular contributors of the magazine. The magazine folded in 1961.

References

1945 establishments in Italy
1961 disestablishments in Italy
Bi-monthly magazines published in Italy
Communist magazines
Defunct literary magazines published in Italy
Defunct political magazines published in Italy
Italian-language magazines
Magazines established in 1945
Magazines disestablished in 1961
Magazines published in Rome
Magazines published in Florence
Poetry literary magazines
Quarterly magazines published in Italy